This is the list of United Kingdom MPs by seniority, 2015–2017.  The Members of Parliament (MPs) are ranked by the beginning of their terms in office, in the House of Commons.

The House of Commons of the 56th Parliament of the United Kingdom was elected on 7 May 2015 and first met on 18 May 2015. Under the  Fixed-term Parliaments Act 2011 (as amended) the next general election was scheduled to be on 7 May 2020. An early election or one delayed by up to two months were possible in certain circumstances. In the event an early general election was authorised, by a two-thirds vote of the House of Commons, with the election being arranged for 8 June 2017. The formal dissolution of Parliament takes place twenty-five working days before the polling day to elect the new Parliament.

The constituencies and party affiliations listed reflect those during the 56th Parliament. Seats and party affiliations for other Parliaments will be different for certain members.

This article describes the criteria for seniority in the House of Commons, as set out in Father of the House: a House of Commons background paper.

Seniority criteria
The criteria for seniority, used in this article, are derived from the way that the Father of the House is selected. They are not laid down in Standing Orders but arise from the customary practice of the House of Commons.

The modern custom is that the Father of the House is the MP who has the longest continuous service. If two or more members were first elected in the same General Election (or at by-elections held on the same day), then priority is given to the one who was sworn in first. The order of swearing in is recorded in Hansard, the official record of proceedings.

When a member has had broken service, that does not affect his or her seniority (for the purpose of qualifying as the Father of the House) which is based on the latest period of continuous service.

The Sinn Féin members, who abstain from taking their seats at Westminster, have never been sworn in. They are ranked (in this list) after all other members who have taken their seats. Between themselves they are ranked by the first date of election, for the current period of continuous service. If that criterion is equal, then they are ranked by alphabetical order of surnames.

In the House of Commons, the sole mandatory duty of the Father of the House is to preside over the election of a new Speaker whenever that office becomes vacant. The relevant Standing Order does not refer to this member by the title "Father of the House", referring instead to the longest-serving member of the House present who is not a Minister of the Crown (meaning that if the Father is absent or a government minister, the next person in line presides).

Summary of members elected by party

Notes
See here for a full list of changes during the fifty-sixth Parliament.
In addition to the parties listed in the table above, the Co-operative Party was also represented in the House of Commons by Labour MPs sitting with the Labour Co-operative designation. The number of these MPs was 24 after the general election, and was 28 at dissolution.
The actual government majority was calculated as Conservative MPs less all other parties. This calculation excluded the Speaker, Deputy Speakers (two Labour and one Conservative) and Sinn Féin (who followed a policy of abstentionism).

List of Members of Parliament by seniority
This article assigns a numerical rank to each of the 650 members initially elected to the 56th Parliament. Other members, who were not the first person declared elected to a seat but who joined the House during the Parliament, are not assigned a number.

See also
List of MPs elected in the 2015 United Kingdom general election
List of United Kingdom by-elections (2010–present)

References

External links
 Father of the House: House of Commons background paper Retrieved 19 May 2015 
 Members 1979-2010 Retrieved 16 March 2015

2015 United Kingdom general election
2015
Seniority